Battista Spinola was the 47th Doge of Genoa. He was elected on January 4, 1531 and held office for two years. Battista was the father of Luca Spinola who was the 57th Doge of Genoa.

Sources
Malleson, George Bruce. Studies in Genoese History. p. 303

16th-century Doges of Genoa
Year of death unknown
Battista
Year of birth unknown